Nathan A. Brewington was a state legislator in Alabama during the Reconstruction era. He represented Lowndes County from 1868 until 1870. He was prosperous.

References

Members of the Alabama House of Representatives
African-American politicians during the Reconstruction Era
19th-century American politicians
People from Lowndes County, Alabama
Year of birth missing
Year of death missing